The North Texas Premier Soccer Association (NTPSA) is a soccer league based in North Texas which is run under the USASA. The league gained some fame once one of their clubs Dallas Roma F.C. reached the fourth round of the 2006 Lamar Hunt U.S. Open Cup. This was followed by the NTX Rayados also reaching the fourth round of the 2018 Lamar Hunt U.S. Open Cup.

NTPSA is a non-profit adult men sports organization serving Dallas and the seven surrounding counties in North Texas.  Organized in 1974 as a combination of two leagues, NTPSA has grown over the last 25 years to 5,000+ players annually in 4 age groupings.  This league has age group divisions for ages 19–29, 30-39, 40-49, and 50-and-over age brackets.

Clubs

Men's Open Divisions 

Accurate as of 29 JANUARY 2019

Previous Division 1A Winners

Current Division 1A Table

References

External links
 North Texas Premier Soccer Association
 Save the NTPSA
 North Texas Premier Soccer Association Public Record
Soccer in Texas
United States Adult Soccer Association leagues
1974 establishments in Texas
Sports leagues established in 1974
Regional Soccer leagues in the United States